Liu Baiyu (2 September 1916 – 24 August 2005), born Liu Yuzan in Beijing, was a Chinese writer who took an orthodox Communist line on writing issues. He opposed "Western bourgeois values", influencing Chinese literature.

Awards
1988 - Co-winner of the Mao Dun Literature Prize

References

1916 births
2005 deaths
Short story writers from Beijing
People's Republic of China essayists
Chinese male novelists
Mao Dun Literature Prize laureates
Chinese male short story writers
20th-century Chinese short story writers
20th-century Chinese male writers
20th-century essayists
People's Republic of China short story writers